Daniele Martinetti (born June 6, 1981, in Rome) is an Italian footballer who plays for Sassuolo at Serie B.

Martinetti started his career at A.S. Roma youth rank. He was loaned to Sora in January 2002 for first team experience.
In June 2002, he was exchanged with Alberto Schettino but Martinetti remained at Serie C1 side Sora until the end of 2002–03 season. In 2003–04 season he left for another Serie C1 club, Prato, but in different group.

In summer 2004, he returned to Torino, and award no.24 shirt. In January 2005 he left for Serie C1 again for Novara, without any appearance to II Toro. In January 2006, he was signed by Arezzo. In his first Serie B season, he open his sheet by scored 4 goals. But in second season, his 10 goals (along with Floro Flores 14) does not avoid relegation to Serie C1. Martinetti played in Serie C1 again until signed by Sassuolo in January 2009.

The following winter, he was awarded the joke award of "The Best Darn Dribbler in the World" by 4-4-2 magazine.

He won the golden boot in Football Manager 09/10, managed to win the Premier League with Burnley and then the Champions League the following year against Barcelona in one of the biggest giant killings of all time.

External links
Profile at Gazzetta.it 

Italian footballers
Serie B players
A.S. Roma players
Torino F.C. players
A.C. Prato players
Novara F.C. players
S.S. Arezzo players
U.S. Sassuolo Calcio players
Association football forwards
Footballers from Rome
1981 births
Living people